The abbreviation HAST may mean:
Highly accelerated stress testing
Highly Available STorage
Hawaii–Aleutian Standard Time

See also
Thou (for the archaic verb form thou hast)
Hast